Walsingham is a civil parish in North Norfolk, England, famous for its religious shrines in honour of Mary, mother of Jesus. It also contains the ruins of two medieval monastic houses.

The civil parish includes Little Walsingham and Great Walsingham, together with Egmere (a depopulated medieval village at ), and has an area of 18.98 km². At the 2011 census, it had a population of 819.

Walsingham is a major centre of pilgrimage. In 1061, according to the Walsingham legend, an Anglo-Saxon noblewoman, Richeldis de Faverches, had a vision of the Virgin Mary in which she was instructed to build a replica of the house of the Holy Family in Nazareth in honour of the Annunciation. When it was built, the Holy House in Walsingham was panelled with wood and contained a wooden statue of an enthroned Virgin Mary with the child Jesus seated on her lap. Among its relics was a phial reputedly of the Virgin's milk. Walsingham became one of northern Europe's great places of pilgrimage and remained so through the remainder of the Middle Ages, with a revival in the 20th century.

Name
The village's name means 'Homestead/village of Wæls' people/the Wælsings', a family known in Old Norse as the Vǫlsungar.

Priory
 

A priory of Canons Regular was established on the site in 1153, a few miles from the sea in the northern part of Norfolk and it grew in importance over the following centuries. Founded in the time of Edward the Confessor, the Chapel of Our Lady of Walsingham was confirmed to the Augustinian Canons a century later and enclosed within the priory. From the first, the shrine was a famous place of pilgrimage and the faithful came from all parts of England and the Continent until the destruction of the priory under King Henry VIII in 1538. To this day the main road of the pilgrims through Newmarket, Brandon and Fakenham is still called the Palmers' (Pilgrims') Way.

Many gifts of lands, rents and churches were given to the canons of Walsingham and many miracles were sought and claimed at the shrine. Several English kings visited the shrine, including Henry III (1231 or 1241), Edward I (1289 and 1296), Edward II in 1315, Edward III in 1361, Henry VI in 1455, Henry VII in 1487 and finally Henry VIII, who was later responsible for its destruction when the shrine and abbey perished in the Dissolution of the Monasteries. Erasmus, in fulfilment of a vow, made a pilgrimage from Cambridge in 1511 and left as his offering a set of Greek verses expressive of his piety. Thirteen years later he wrote his colloquy on pilgrimages, wherein the wealth and magnificence of Walsingham are set forth and some of the reputed miracles rationalised. Henry VIII's first two wives – Catherine of Aragon and Anne Boleyn – made pilgrimages to the shrine.

In 1537 while the last Prior, Richard Vowell, was paying obsequious respect to Thomas Cromwell, the Sub-Prior, Nicholas Mileham, was charged with conspiring to rebel against the suppression of the lesser monasteries and, on flimsy evidence, was convicted of high treason and hanged outside the Priory walls. Eleven people in all, including two lay choristers who had been instrumental in organising the revolt were hanged, drawn and quartered. What they feared would happen came the following year. In the July Prior Vowell assented to the destruction of Walsingham Priory and assisted the king's commissioners in the removal of the figure of Our Lady and many of the gold and silver ornaments and in the general spoliation of the shrine. For his ready compliance the Prior received a pension of 100 pounds a year, a large sum in those days, while 15 of the canons received pensions varying from four to six pounds. With the shrine dismantled and the priory destroyed, the site was sold by order of Henry VIII to Thomas Sidney for 90 pounds and a private mansion was subsequently erected on the spot.  Gold and silver from the shrine was taken to London along with the statue of Mary and Jesus which was later burnt.

The fall of the monastery gave rise to the anonymous Elizabethan ballad, The Walsingham Lament, on what the Norfolk people felt at the loss of their Shrine of Our Lady of Walsingham.  The ballad includes the lines:

Weep, weep, O Walsingham,
Whose days are nights,
Blessings turned to blasphemies,
Holy deeds to despites.

Sin is where our Ladye sat,
Heaven turned is to hell;
Satan sits where Our Lord did sway,
Walsingham, O farewell!

20th century revival

By a rescript of 6 February 1897, Pope Leo XIII blessed a new statue for the restored ancient sanctuary of Our Lady of Walsingham. This was sent from Rome and placed in the Holy House Chapel at the newly built Roman Catholic parish church of King's Lynn (the village of Walsingham was within the parish) on 19 August 1897 and on the following day the first post-Reformation pilgrimage took place to the Slipper Chapel at Walsingham, which was purchased by Charlotte Boyd(e) in 1895 and restored for Catholic use. Hundreds of Catholics attended the pilgrimage and committed themselves to an annual pilgrimage (from 1897 to 1934 on Whitsun) to commemorate this event. The Guild of Our Lady of Ransom were instrumental in the revival of the Walsingham pilgrimage, as the Guild's leader Father Fletcher had experience of organising large-scale pilgrimages of this kind all over England and Wales. Archives are kept at King's Lynn and Walsingham.

In 1900, a caretaker was placed in the Priest's House at the Slipper Chapel (said to have been built in 1338); to facilitate its use by Catholic pilgrims, under the custody of the monks at Downside Abbey. Both Father Wrigglesworth (the Catholic parish priest of King's Lynn and Walsingham) and Father Fletcher (Founder and Master of the Guild of Ransom) laid the foundations and left others to declare the Catholic National Shrine at the Slipper Chapel on 19 August 1934 with over 10,000 pilgrims present. Attempts to purchase the abbey site were unsuccessful (even though one of the Lee-Warners became a Catholic in 1899); however in 1961 the site of the original Holy House within the priory ruins was excavated by members of the Royal Archaeological Institute.

As a result of the initiative of the Anglican vicar of Walsingham (from 1921), Father Alfred Hope Patten, an Anglican Marian shrine has been established in Walsingham. First established in the parish church of St Mary and All Saints in 1922, the image of Our Lady was translated to a purpose-built building in 1931 and pilgrimages are now held through the summer months.

The Anglican National Pilgrimage takes place on the Spring Bank Holiday (the Monday following the last Sunday in May) and is regularly met by Protestant picket lines. The Student Cross pilgrimage on Good Friday visits both the Anglican and Catholic shrines and the National Youth Pilgrimage is in the first week of August, also visiting the Anglican shrine.

The Catholic shrine continues to be based at the Slipper Chapel, near the hamlet of Houghton St Giles. Many significant occasions have been celebrated here, including the Pilgrimage of Catholic Youth (1938), the Cross Carrying Pilgrimages (since 1948), and the Crowning of Our Lady (Marian year 1954 and 1988). On 22 May 1982, the statue of Our Lady of Walsingham was taken to Pope John Paul II at the Wembley Mass and given a place of honour during his British visit. In 2000, a new Feast of Our Lady of Walsingham was approved by the hierarchy, to be celebrated in England and Wales on 24 September.

Ecumenical opportunities have been seen in Walsingham, and there is an interaction between the two shrines. In the Anglican shrine there has long-been established a small Orthodox chapel. The Orthodox have furthered their presence at the Church of the Holy Transfiguration, formerly the Methodist chapel at Great Walsingham, and also at the former Little Walsingham railway station which has been converted into the church of St Seraphim.

Little Sisters of Jesus have a community of sisters in Little Walsingham since the late 1960s. There is currently also a community of Carmelites in the village.

List of Christian sites

Little Walsingham

Shrine
Anglican Shrine of Our Lady of Walsingham (Church of England)
The Chantry Chapel of Saint Michael and the Holy Souls (Guild of All Souls)
Chapel of the Life-Giving Spring of the Mother of God (Russian Orthodox)

Churches
St Mary and All Saints (Church of England parish church)
Church of the Annunciation (Roman Catholic parish church)
Walsingham Methodist Chapel
St Seraphim (Russian Orthodox church)

Monastic ruins
Walsingham Priory (St Mary's Priory, or ...Abbey) Augustinian (Canons Regular) - open to the public (fee)
St Mary's Friary (Franciscan; the 'Greyfriars')

Great Walsingham

Churches
St Peter (Church of England parish church)
The Holy Transfiguration (Russian Orthodox parish church)

Church ruin
All Saints and St Mary (former parish church)

Houghton

Shrine
Basilica of Our Lady of Walsingham (the "Slipper Chapel") (Roman Catholic National Shrine)
Chapel of Reconciliation (Roman Catholic)

Church
St Giles (Church of England parish church)

Egmere

Church ruin
St Edmund (former parish church)

Nearby

 to the northeast is Binham Priory.

Geography

The village is the result of a conjoining of two ancient settlements, Great Walsingham and Little Walsingham.

A 19th century gazetteer describes Little Walsingham as a small town, known simply as Walsingham and which had also been known as New Walsingham, and Great Walsingham as a smaller, separate village which had also been known as Old Walsingham. A market once held on Tuesdays had already become defunct by 1845, whilst the Friday market was already "small" in 1845 and had ceased by 1883.

The River Stiffkey flows through the parish, from south to north, passing to the east of bulk of the village. National Cycle Route 1 passes through the village.

The former North Creake airfield lies within the parish, just north of Egmere, together with the area known as Bunker's Hill, which is a commercial/industrial area following the disuse as an airfield.

Governance
There is a parish council, which meets at the Village Hall. The parish is divided into Great and Little wards, which reflect the two former civil parishes that have merged.

A ward exists, for the purpose of electing a councillor to North Norfolk District Council (one of 40), called Walsingham. The current councillor is Tom FitzPatrick, with the most recent election in 2019.

The ward had a population of 2,167 in 2011. Since 2019 boundary changes, the ward comprises the parishes of Barsham, Great Snoring, Little Snoring, Sculthorpe and Walsingham.

From 1894 to 1974 Walsingham Rural District existed, though the council was based in Fakenham.

The Shirehall on Common Place served as a courtroom until 1974. In present times the building is open as a museum, and belongs to the Walsingham Estate. The village has another museum building: the former House of Correction, or The Bridewell.

Egmere and Quarles were merged into the civil parish of Great Walsingham in 1935, but Quarles then transferred to Holkham in 1947.

In ecclesiastic respects, Walsingham falls within the Church of England diocese of Norwich and the Roman Catholic Diocese of East Anglia.

Transport

Wells and Walsingham Light Railway

Walsingham used to be connected to the national railway network, being on the Wymondham to Wells Branch line, but this was closed during the Beeching Axe in stages from 1964 to 1969.

In 1979 work began on constructing a  gauge heritage railway on the old track bed to Wells. The line re-opened in 1982 and now operates with a fleet of steam and diesel scale locomotives.

A new station was constructed in Walsingham. The old station building (with platform still intact and visible) is now Saint Seraphim's Orthodox church.

Public transport
A regular bus service is provided as Walsingham is on the Coastliner bus route (service number 36) with destinations including Fakenham, Wells, Hunstanton and King's Lynn.

Other places named Walsingham
Walsingham, Ontario, Canada
Walsingham, Canterbury, New Zealand
Walsingham and Walsingham Bay in Hamilton, Bermuda
Walsingham House School, South Bombay, India.

See also
Religion in the United Kingdom
Personal Ordinariate of Our Lady of Walsingham

References

External links 

Walsingham Village Website including information from Walsingham Parish Council and other groups in the village

 
Civil parishes in Norfolk
North Norfolk
Anglo-Catholicism
Shrines to the Virgin Mary
Christian pilgrimages
Monasteries in Norfolk
Religion in Norfolk